Pyroglutamylated RFamide peptide receptor also known as orexigenic neuropeptide QRFP receptor or G-protein coupled receptor 103 (GPR103) is a protein that in humans is encoded by the QRFPR gene.

Function

G protein-coupled receptors (GPCRs, or GPRs) contain 7 transmembrane domains and transduce extracellular signals through heterotrimeric G proteins.

A 26-amino acid RF-amide peptide, P518 functions as a high-affinity ligand of GPR103. Both GPR103 and P518 precursor mRNA exhibited highest expression in brain. The 43-amino acid QRFP peptide, a longer form of the P518 peptide is necessary to exhibit full agonistic activity with GPR103. Intravenous administration QRFP caused release of aldosterone, suggesting that QRFP and GPR103 regulate adrenal function.

References

Further reading

External links

G protein-coupled receptors